The government of Great Britain was under the joint leadership of Prime Minister Robert Walpole (in the House of Commons) and Charles Townshend, 2nd Viscount Townshend (in the House of Lords), from 1721 until Townshend departed from the government in 1730.

Cabinet

See also
 1722 British general election
 1727 British general election
 5th Parliament of Great Britain
 Whigs (British political party)

Notes

References

 
 

British ministries
Government
1720s in Great Britain
1721 establishments in Great Britain
1730 disestablishments in Great Britain
Robert Walpole
Ministries of George I of Great Britain
Ministries of George II of Great Britain
1730s in Great Britain